High winds can blow railway trains off tracks and cause accidents.

Dangers of high winds 
High winds can cause problems in a number of ways:

 blow trains off the tracks
 blow trains or wagons along the tracks and cause collisions
 cause cargo to blow off trains which can damage objects outside the railway or which other trains can collide with
 cause pantographs and overhead wiring to tangle
 cause trees and other objects to fall onto the railway.

Preventative measures 
Risks from high winds can be reduced by:
 wind fences akin to snow sheds
 lower profile of carriages
 lowered centre of gravity of vehicles
 reduction in train speed or cancellation, at high winds
 a wider rail gauge
 improve overhead wiring with:
 regulated tension rather than fixed terminations
 shorter catenary spans
 solid conductors

By country

Australia 
 1928 – 47 wagons blown along line at Tocumwal
 1931 – Kandos – wind blows level crossing gates closed in front of motor-cyclist 
 1943 – Hobart, Tasmania; Concern that wind will blow over doubledeck trams on  gauge if top deck enclosed.
 2010 – Marla, South Australia; Small tornado blows over train.

Austria 
 1910 – Trieste (now in Italy) – train blown down embankment.

China 
 Lanxin High-Speed Railway#Wind shed risk
 February 28, 2007 – Wind blows 10 passenger rail cars off the track near Turpan, China.

Denmark 
 Great Belt Bridge rail accident. On 2 January 2019 a DSB express passenger train is hit by a semi-trailer from a passing cargo train on the western bridge of the Great Belt Fixed Link during Storm Alfrida, killing eight people and injuring 16.

Germany 
 Rügen narrow-gauge railway, 20 October 1936: derailment of a train, five injured

India 
 One reason for choosing broad gauge in India for greater stability in high winds.

Ireland 
 On the night of 30 January 1925, strong winds derailed carriages of a train crossing the Owencarrow Viaduct of the  gauge Londonderry and Lough Swilly Railway.

Japan 
 Inaho
 Amarube Viaduct
 1895 Gale blows train into sea

New Zealand 
 Rimutaka Incline railway accident

Norway 
 Makrellbekken (station)#Wind related accident – blowing snow disoriented a tractor driver who collided with a train

South Africa 
 Wind tangles overhead wiring in Cape Town, 2012.

United Kingdom 
 Tay Bridge disaster 1879
 Chelford rail accident 1894 – during shunting
 De-wirements on the East Coast Main Line
 Leven Viaduct, Cumbria 27 February 1903
 Cheddington 2008 – two containers blown off train – design of "spigots" criticised.
 Moston 2015 – out of gauge train hits platform, throwing stones onto other track.
 Scout Green 2015 – empty 30-foot ISA container blown off train

United States 
 On April 24, 1883, 2 cars of a passenger train were blown from the narrow-gauge Denver, South Park and Pacific Railroad tracks near Como, Colorado, with only minor injuries.
 Around 6:15pm, May 6, 1876, a passenger train traveling south on the Illinois Central Railroad at about 23 miles per hour was derailed during a storm just south of Neoga, Illinois. Numerous minor injuries were reported.
 Around 7am, Feb. 23, 1884, 2 cars were blown off the narrow-gauge tracks of the Colorado Central Railroad near Georgetown, Colorado.
 Around 2pm, February 4, 1885, the wind overturned an entire 3-car Colorado Central Railroad train just east of Georgetown, Colorado.  The express train had slowed to 8 miles per hour because of the wind. 18 out of 20 passengers were injured.
 At 3:30pm, April 1, 1892, a narrow-gauge passenger train of the Burlington and Northwestern Railway was blown off the tracks while running at full speed 1 mile east of Butler, a station between Fremont, Iowa and Hedrick, Iowa.; 4 were seriously injured, a dozen more suffered minor injuries.  Note that the location places this on the Burlington and Western Railway tracks.
 On September 2, 1911, tram services in Charleston, South Carolina, were suspended due to winds.
 On June 28, 1986, a derecho derailed 18 piggyback cars on the Kate Shelley High Bridge over the Des Moines River in Iowa.
 On June 29, 1998, the Corn Belt Derecho blew several double stack and piggyback cars off the Iowa Interstate Railroad bridge across the Iowa River.
 A 2008 tornado in Northern Illinois derailed a Union Pacific train. Dramatic footage of the event was captured by a camera mounted on the train.
 On April 27, 2015, a severe storm knocked several double stack cars off the track as a train crossed the Huey P. Long Bridge, New Orleans, Louisiana, with no injuries. The accident was captured by a WGNO News Team dashcam.
 On March 13, 2019, mid-day winds of around 80 mph derailed the rear 26 cars of a double stack train on the Union Pacific high steel trestle over the Canadian River south of Logan, New Mexico.

One reason for choosing broad gauge (17% wider than standard gauge) for BART was the greater stability in high winds and perhaps earthquakes.

Factors 
 Lightweight trains
 Narrow gauge
 Aspects of the terrain 
 Tunnels

See also 
 Snowshed

References 

Fences
Wind
Railway
Railway